Simon James Marshall (born 20 September 1982) is an English cricketer who was released by Lancashire County Cricket Club in 2008.  He bats right-handed and bowls right arm leg breaks. He was educated at Birkenhead School and Pembroke College, Cambridge, where he read Land Economy from 2001 to 2004.

Marshall has also represented Cambridge University Centre of Cricketing Excellence and made his Lancashire debut in 2005, but he made his big breakthrough in 2006. Marshall attended Birkenhead School. After four seasons with Lancashire, Marshall left at the end of the 2008 season when the club decided not to renew his contract. During his time at Lancashire, Marshall appeared in 9 first-class matches taking 15 wickets at 45.60. In 2008, Marshall played in only two first-class and four list A matches, but in his nine Twenty20 appearances for Lancashire he took 14 wickets at an average of 13.57.

References

External links
 

1982 births
Living people
Alumni of Pembroke College, Cambridge
English cricketers
Lancashire cricketers
Sportspeople from Birkenhead
Cheshire cricketers
Cambridge University cricketers
British Universities cricketers
Cambridge MCCU cricketers